Christopher Simpson (born 17 May 1890, date of death unknown) was a cricketer. He played in eight first-class matches for British Guiana from 1909 to 1912.

See also
 List of Guyanese representative cricketers

References

External links
 

1890 births
Year of death missing
Cricketers from British Guiana
Marylebone Cricket Club cricketers